Lazzaro Grimaldi Cebà (Genoa, 1520 - Genoa, February 16, 1599) was the 81st Doge of the Republic of Genoa.

Biography 
Grimaldi Cebà was elected to the dogal title on December 7, 1597, the thirty-sixth in biennial succession and the eighty-first in republican history, despite a difficult election due to the clashes of the two main parties led by Ambrogio Spinola and Cosimo Centurione, his supporters at the appointment, with the other noble front led by the powerful Giovanni Andrea Doria. The fatigue caused by the events of his new office as Doge undermined the Grimaldi's already precarious health, so much so that, after a few days in bed, he died of a subsequent stroke attack on September 16, 1599. His Dogate stopped, therefore, ten months before the natural expiry of the mandate.

See also 

 Republic of Genoa
 Doge of Genoa
 House of Grimaldi

References 

16th-century Doges of Genoa
1520 births
1599 deaths

House of Grimaldi